Lomabad (also Romanized as Lomābād)

 is a village in Malard Rural District, in the Central District of Malard County, Alborz Province, Iran. At the 2006 census, its population was 4,123, in 994 families.

References 

Populated places in Malard County